Junk Raiders 3 is the third and final season of the Canadian reality television series  that airs on The Discovery Channel and ION Life.  The series follows the titular Junk Raiders, a team of eight professionals as they attempt to renovate an old sports bar and renovate it to a modern restaurant in one month with only a C$5,000 budget.  Because of the extremely limited budget, many of the materials needed must be found by freecycling: finding something unwanted for free and reusing it.

The Team
The team consists of the following members, both new and returning:

Daniel Janetos airs in his first television series. Daniel is the opening Toronto-based consultant chef for The Farmhouse Tavern. Chef Dan gets into heated discussions with Geoff as he attempts to push for his kitchen standards.
Geoff Woodmansey returns for the third season of the series.  Besides his work on this show and on Canada's Worst Handyman, he spends his time renovating homes in some of Toronto's most exclusive neighborhoods.
Gordie Wornoff, also in his third season of the series, is a professional salvager who salvages as a way of life.  He is skilled in carpentry, having built his house from repurposed wood, and he is also a freegan, regularly eating otherwise good food that has been disposed of.
Michelle Mawby is the third returning member of the Junk Raiders team.  In the past, she was perfectly willing to rip out perfectly good interiors for perfectly new interiors.  In this, her second season of the series, she is more focused on what she needs for this project and how she is going to get it.
Siamak Ashrafinia is an Iranian-born master craftsman, who now plies his craft in Canada as a sign maker.  He has many other talents, including the ability to fix almost anything.  Because he is also deaf, his son, Saeed Ashrafinia, an IT specialist, is also on board as his apprentice and interpreter.
Chuck Barnett is resourceful, energetic, and incredibly crafty. He's the kind of guy who has never found himself needing anything that he couldn't just build himself. Online he's known as "The Cheap Bastard," starring in a ridiculously popular series of how-to videos for how to live life frugally. Chuck lives on the Kahnawake Mohawk Reservation just outside Montreal. For this season, he is also the operator of the official Junk Raiders Twitter account, @JunkRaiders.
Lara Finley is a high-end furniture builder who got into the trades when she accidentally ended up taking "construction technology" in high school.  She then continued her studies at Sheridan College (SOCAD) taking the Furniture Design Program, and is now the president of Her Rough Hands Inc. specializing in fine furniture and custom millwork.
Blair Harvey is the first member of the Junk Raiders team from Newfoundland and Labrador.  He is a carpenter by trade, and well-versed in creatively reusing available resources, because, in his own words, "that's what all Newfoundlanders do".
Al Swanky is a furniture upholsterer, who found his passion for upholstery after deciding to sew leather costumes for his metal band.

The team's client is Darcy MacDonnell, the general manager of some of the fanciest restaurants in Toronto.  In addition to the incredible pressure of finishing the renovation to his standards, he also wants the restaurant to be ready for opening night, and wants his new restaurant's first impression to be a good one.

2012 Canadian television seasons